Nikola Soldo (born 25 January 2001) is a Croatian professional footballer who plays as a defender for the Bundesliga club 1. FC Köln.

Club career
He began his career in the Dinamo Zagreb youth system, joining the club in 2008 during his father Zvonimir's managerial spell with the first team. He was recognized as a promising talent, even before his teenage years. He bounced around with several clubs before settling at Inter Zaprešić in 2015.

Soldo made his professional debut on 16 August 2019 as a member of the starting lineup during a 2–1 loss to Dinamo Zagreb. Three months later, he scored his first goal in the final minutes of a defeat to Rijeka. On 1 September 2022, the last day of the German transfer window, Soldo was transferred to Bundesliga club 1.FC Köln. He signed a contract until 2025 with the club.

Personal life
His father Zvonimir was a long-time member of the Croatia national team, notably playing at the UEFA Euro 1996, and the 1998 and 2002 FIFA World Cups. At the club level, he played with Dinamo Zagreb, Zadar and Inter Zaprešić in his native country before finishing his career with a ten-year spell at VfB Stuttgart. Nikola was born in Stuttgart in 2001, midway through his father's fifth season in Germany.

His older brothers, Matija and Filip, are footballers as well, with Filip currently represting Inter Zaprešić.

Career statistics

Club

References

External links
 

2001 births
Living people
Footballers from Stuttgart
Citizens of Croatia through descent
Association football defenders
Croatian footballers
Croatia youth international footballers
Croatia under-21 international footballers
NK Inter Zaprešić players
NK Lokomotiva Zagreb players
1. FC Köln players
First Football League (Croatia) players
Croatian Football League players
Bundesliga players
Croatian expatriate footballers
Expatriate footballers in Germany
Croatian expatriate sportspeople in Germany